is an athletic stadium in Tokyo, Japan.

It hosted the 1949 Emperor's Cup and final game between University of Tokyo LB and Kandai Club was played there on June 5, 1949.

External links

Sports venues in Tokyo
Football venues in Japan